General elections were held in Belgium on 31 March 1968. The Christian Social Party remained the largest party. Voter turnout was 90.0%. Elections for the nine provincial councils were also held.

The snap elections were called after the government, a coalition of the Christian Social Party and the liberal Party for Freedom and Progress led by Christian Democrat Paul Vanden Boeynants, fell due to the Leuven Crisis.

The linguistic crisis would trigger the split of the dominant Christian Social Party into a Flemish and French-speaking party. The two other main parties would follow suit. The crisis also caused the rise of small linguistic, federalist parties, such as the People's Union on the Flemish side and the Democratic Front of the Francophones and Walloon Rally on the French-speaking side.

Results

Chamber of Deputies

Senate

References

1968 elections in Belgium
March 1968 events in Europe